Mike Morin (born July 20, 1971) is a Canadian former professional ice hockey player. Morin currently resides in Manchester, UK and is the Assistant Coach for the Manchester Storm.

Early career
Born in Melville, Saskatchewan, Morin began his career at NCAA level, playing for Lake Superior State University.  Morin was a regular and reliable first team player, icing in 165 games in four seasons and scoring 129 points in the process.

Morin then made the transition to professional standard ice hockey, signing for the ECHL team, the Richmond Renegades.  Again he would produce an excellent points output, with 38 points scored in just 47 appearances.  Unfortunately the Renegades failed to qualify for the post-season.  Morin would step up a level for the following season, 1995/96, and would line up as a Providence Bruins  player.  Although not a regular first teamer at the higher level, Morin would play 25 times during the regular season as well as making a handful of post-season appearances.  In 1996, Morin would also briefly play roller hockey in the RHI for the San Jose Rhinos before returning to the more familiar ice surface for the following season.

Move to UK Ice Hockey

Manchester Storm
It would be the 1996/97 season when Morin would make the decision to move to Europe, signing for the Manchester Storm, once the best supported ice hockey team in Europe.  At the time the Storm were playing in the Ice Hockey Superleague, a newly established league which was proving popular with the fans.  It was then the highest standard of ice hockey in Europe.  Morin proved himself to be somewhat of an 'unsung hero' for the Storm, and through his hard work and dedication became one of the most important players on the team.

Morin showed loyalty to the Storm, playing for them for six seasons in total, up until the end of the 2001/02 season when his contract was not renewed by then head coach Daryl Lipsey.  Morin's work rate, effort and physical style combined with his loyalty to the organisation meant that he was firmly established as a 'fan favourite' in Manchester by the time of his departure, with many fans calling for a testimonial game.

BNL and Sheffield Steelers
After his contract was not renewed, Morin took the opportunity to sign for the Hull Thunder, a team icing in the British National League, generally regarded as the league below the ISL.  Morin's experience at the higher level served him well as he scored 17 points in 22 games.  It would be a brief spell in the BNL for Morin as he would be signed, part way through the season by the ISL Sheffield Steelers.  It was a move that many saw as controversial due to the intense rivalry between the Storm and the Steelers, often referred to as the 'War of the Roses'.

Manchester Phoenix
Morin was released by the Steelers in 2003, and was promptly re-signed with the newly established Manchester Phoenix organisation - he was in fact head coach Rick Brebant's first signing. The Phoenix had been established following the collapse of the Manchester Storm in 2003 due to off-ice financial problems.  The 2003/04 season would be the Phoenix's first competitive season and it would be in the Elite Ice Hockey League, which was formed after the gradual meltdown of the ISL.  Morin re-claimed his place as fan favourite in Manchester and was installed as alternate captain as a recognition for his years of service to ice hockey in Manchester. Morin is one of a handful of players to have played for both Manchester Storm and Manchester Phoenix.

At the end of the 2003/04 season, the Phoenix franchise would be temporarily suspended, again due to financial costs.  This prompted Morin to declare his retirement from the game.  Morin is still a widely popular figure in U.K. ice hockey, especially in Manchester, where he is regarded as one of the most respected players to play professional standard ice hockey in the city.

Move into Coaching
On 24 November 2015, it was announced that Morin would be returning to the Manchester Storm as Assistant Coach. Morin remains in this position as of the 2017/18 season.

Shirt Retirement
At the end of the 2016/17 season, it was announced by the Manchester Storm organisation that Morin's number 15 shirt would be shirt retirement for services to Manchester Storm both as a player and assistant coach. The shirt retirement took place on 12 November 2017 prior to a match against Milton Keynes Lightning.

Career statistics

References

External links
 
Mike Morin Personal Profile, Manchester Phoenix Official Website.
"Morin Reveals Storm Snub", Manchester Evening News, 29/09/02

1972 births
Canadian ice hockey forwards
Hull Thunder players
Lake Superior State Lakers men's ice hockey players
Living people
Manchester Phoenix players
Manchester Storm (1995–2002) players
Providence Bruins players
Richmond Renegades players
Sheffield Steelers players
San Jose Rhinos players
Canadian expatriate ice hockey players in England
NCAA men's ice hockey national champions